The 1991 FIS Freestyle World Ski Championships were held between February 11th and February 17th in Lake Placid, New York. The World Championships featured both men's and women's events in the Moguls, Aerials, Acro Skiing and the Combined.

Results

Men's results

Moguls

Aerials

Acro Skiing

Combined

Women's results

Moguls

Aerials

Acro Skiing

Combined

References

External links
 FIS Freestyle Skiing Home
 Results from the FIS

1991
1991 in American sports
1991 in freestyle skiing
Freestyle skiing competitions in the United States
Skiing in New York (state)
1991 in sports in New York (state)